The 1970–71 Israel State Cup (Gvia HaMedina) was the 32nd season of Israel's nationwide football cup competition and the 17th after the Israeli Declaration of Independence.

Hakoah Maccabi Ramat Gan and Maccabi Haifa made their way to the final, which was played on 16 June 1971, Hakoah winning 2–1 to obtain its second cup.

Results

Second round

Also promoted from this round: Maccabi Afula, Hapoel Givat HaMoreh and Hapoel Kafr Yasif

Third round

Fourth round
Liga Alef clubs entered the competition on this round. As in previous seasons, The draw was set so that Liga Alef clubs wouldn't be drawn against each other.

Fifth round

Sixth Round
Liga Leumit clubs entered the competition in this round. The IFA arranged the draw so each Liga Leumit clubs wouldn't be drawn to play each other.

Seventh Round

Quarter-finals

Semi-finals

Final

Notes

References
100 Years of Football 1906-2006, Elisha Shohat (Israel), 2006

Israel State Cup
State Cup
Israel State Cup seasons